Rahimjan Ekber (born 6 July 1999) is a Chinese footballer currently playing as a midfielder for Xinjiang Tianshan Leopard.

Career statistics

Club
.

References

1999 births
Living people
Chinese footballers
Association football midfielders
China League One players
Xinjiang Tianshan Leopard F.C. players